Hélio Rubens Garcia (born Franca, Brazil, September 2, 1940), also commonly known as Hélio Rubens, is a former Brazilian professional basketball player and coach.

Professional playing career
During his pro club career, Rubens Garcia won 4 Brazilian Championships, in the years 1971, 1974, 1975, and 1980.

National team playing career
With the senior Brazilian national basketball team, Rubens Garcia played at the 1967, 1970, 1974 and 1978 editions of the FIBA World Cup. He also played at the 1968 Summer Olympic Games, and the 1972 Summer Olympic Games.

National team coaching career
Hélio Rubens was the head coach of the senior Brazilian national basketball team at the 1990 FIBA World Cup, the 1998 FIBA World Cup, and the 2002 FIBA World Cup.

External links
FIBA Profile
CBB Profile 

1940 births
Living people
Brazilian basketball coaches
Basketball players at the 1968 Summer Olympics
Basketball players at the 1971 Pan American Games
Basketball players at the 1972 Summer Olympics
Basketball players at the 1975 Pan American Games
Basketball players at the 1979 Pan American Games
Brazilian men's basketball players
1967 FIBA World Championship players
1970 FIBA World Championship players
1974 FIBA World Championship players
1978 FIBA World Championship players
Club de Regatas Vasco da Gama basketball coaches
Esporte Clube Sírio basketball players
Franca Basquetebol Clube coaches
Franca Basquetebol Clube players
Olympic basketball players of Brazil
Pan American Games bronze medalists for Brazil
Pan American Games gold medalists for Brazil
Pan American Games medalists in basketball
People from Franca
Point guards
Sport Club Corinthians Paulista basketball players
Unitri/Uberlândia basketball coaches
Medalists at the 1971 Pan American Games
Medalists at the 1979 Pan American Games
Medalists at the 1999 Pan American Games
Sportspeople from São Paulo (state)